The 2018 Men's Hockey Champions Trophy was the 37th and the last edition of the Hockey Champions Trophy for men. It was held from 23 June to 1 July 2018 in Breda, Netherlands. The tournament will be replaced by the Hockey Pro League (HPL) in 2019.

Australia won their 15th title by defeating India in the final after penalties.

Qualification
Alongside the host nation, the defending champions, the last Olympic, World Cup and World League champions qualified automatically. The remaining spots were nominated by the FIH Executive Board, making a total of 6 competing teams. If teams qualified under more than one criterion, the additional teams were invited by the FIH Executive Board as well.

 (Host nation)
 (Defending champions and champions of the 2014 World Cup and 2016–17 World League)
 (Champions of 2016 Summer Olympics)
 (Invited by the FIH Executive Board)
 (Invited by the FIH Executive Board)
 (Invited by the FIH Executive Board)

Squads

Head coach: Germán Orozco

Head coach: Colin Batch

Head coach: Shane McLeod

Head coach: Harendra Singh

Head coach: Max Caldas

Head coach: Roelant Oltmans

Results
All times are local (UTC+2).

Standings

Results

Classification

Fifth and sixth place

Third and fourth place

Final

Statistics

Final standings

Awards
The following individual awards were given at the conclusion of the tournament.

Goalscorers
6 goals

  Gonzalo Peillat

5 goals

  Mirco Pruyser

4 goals

  Blake Govers

3 goals

  Trent Mitton
  Harmanpreet Singh
  Mandeep Singh
  Jeroen Hertzberger
  Aleem Bilal

2 goals

  Matías Paredes
  Tim Brand
  Lachlan Sharp
  Tom Boon
  Cédric Charlier
  Amaury Keusters
  Florent van Aubel
  Roel Bovendeert
  Ajaz Ahmad

1 goal

  Tom Craig
  Jake Harvie
  Jake Whetton
  Thomas Briels
  Arthur De Sloover
  John-John Dohmen
  Loïck Luypaert
  Varun Kumar
  Vivek Prasad
  Dilpreet Singh
  Ramandeep Singh
  Lalit Upadhyay
  Thierry Brinkman
  Robbert Kemperman
  Seve van Ass
  Thijs van Dam
  Valentin Verga
  Mubashar Ali
  Muhammad Irfan Jr.
  Ali Shan
  Toseeq Arshad

References

External links
 

Champions Trophy (field hockey)
Champions Trophy
International field hockey competitions hosted by the Netherlands
Hockey Champions Trophy Men
Hockey Champions Trophy Men
Hockey Champions Trophy Men
Sports competitions in Breda